The End of Solomon Grundy is a 1964 crime novel by the British writer Julian Symons. The title refers to a line in the nursery rhyme Solomon Grundy.

Synopsis
The body of a young woman is found in a mews in Mayfair, police at first believe she is a prostitute. Superintendent Manners comes to believe she was actually murdered in a new suburban housing estate known as The Dell where advertising man Solomon Grundy lives.

References

Bibliography
 Bargainnier, Earl F. Twelve Englishmen of Mystery. Popular Press, 1984.
 Stade, George & Karbiener, Karen. Encyclopedia of British Writers, 1800 to the Present, Volume 2. 2010.
 Walsdorf, John J. & Allen, Bonnie J. Julian Symons: A Bibliography. Oak Knoll Press, 1996.
 Winks, Robin W. & Corrigan, Maureen. Mystery and Suspense Writers: The Literature of Crime, Detection, and Espionage, Volume 2. Charles Scribner's, 1998.

1964 British novels
Novels by Julian Symons
British crime novels
British mystery novels
British detective novels
Collins Crime Club books
Novels set in London